Selm is a town in the district of Unna, in North Rhine-Westphalia, Germany.

Geography 

The town belongs to the southern part of the Münsterland. It is surrounded by (beginning in the west) Olfen, Lüdinghausen, Nordkirchen (all in the district of Coesfeld), Werne, Lünen (both in the district of Unna), Waltrop, and Datteln (both belonging to the district of Recklinghausen).

History 

The first traces of living people in the area date from the younger half of the Stone Age.

In 858 it was mentioned as Seliheim in the Dreingau.

In the early Middle Ages Selm was ruled by the count of Cappenberg, then by the bishop of Münster. In the beginning of the 19th century it was transferred to Prussia, to which it remained, as part of the province of Westphalia, until 1946.

In 1906 the coal mine Zeche Hermann was established, transferring coal from 1,200 m under underground. The coal miners and their families lived in the Beifang quarter, which had in the origin a very rural landscape. The number of inhabitants increased from 2,000 to 10,000 in only one year, with c. 3,500 coal miners working at the plant. In 1926 the coal mine was closed.

After World War II numerous inhabitants from Beifang found work in Lünen, in a coal mine called Zeche Minister Achenbach. They were brought to that coal mine by buses. After 1965 when the houses in Beifang were sold a lot of people from the south came to Selm to live there.

In 1975 , a village in the southern neighbourhood, was annexed to a part of Selm, which obtained city status in 1977. The Baroque church in Bork, St. Stephanus, was built in the 1720s.

Selm is twinned with Workington in the United Kingdom.

Historical population

The number of inhabitants shown here are from 31 December in the given year.

References

External links

 
Städtisches Gymnasium Selm – the local grammar/high school 

Unna (district)